"Always Have, Always Will" is a song written by Johnny Mears, and recorded by American country music artist Janie Fricke.  It was released in June 1986 as the first single from the album Black and White.  The song was Fricke's seventh and final number one on the country chart as a solo artist.  The single went to number one for one week and spent fourteen weeks on the country chart.

Chart performance

References

1986 singles
1986 songs
Janie Fricke songs
Song recordings produced by Norro Wilson
Columbia Records singles